R. A. Long High School is the oldest high school serving the city of Longview, Washington. A part of Longview Public Schools, it was erected in 1927, three years after the city of Longview was incorporated. The total student enrollment at the end of the 2015–2016 school year was 890. The school is named for the city's founder, Robert A. Long, a wealthy timber baron from Missouri. Their mascot, the Lumberjack, was so named due to the area's reliance on the timber industry. The female students and sports teams are sometimes referred to as "Lumberjills." The school is on the city Historical Register, with the following inscription: "This school, a gift to the City of Longview by Robert A. Long, was designed by William B. Ittner. The two story Corinthian columns and clock tower dominates the Georgian Revival style. The 900-seat auditorium serves as an educational and cultural center. The building and grounds are listed on the National Register of Historic Places."

Student body and curriculum 
Every senior at R. A. Long is required to complete a senior project consisting of a research paper and a senior oral presentation. Seniors must have a minimum of 24 hours of community service and at least 12 service to school points in order to graduate.

Many classes and programs in the Longview school district are shared between both R. A. Long and Mark Morris High School, such as the Dana Brown Mainstage Theatre program, higher level math, science, language classes, and the orchestra.

In the past, it has been a tradition at R. A. Long for graduating seniors to hand off a small token or gift to the current principal (and the class counselor), often taking the form of a monetary sum based on the year, paper cups from local fast-food restaurants, or playing cards.

Lumberjack sports 
R. A. Long High School currently competes in the Washington Interscholastic Activities Association (WIAA) Greater St. Helens 2A league.  The football team shares the Longview Memorial Stadium with cross-town rival Mark Morris High School. The basketball team competes in the R. A. Long Gymnasium, playing in two "Civil War" games versus Mark Morris each year. One is held at R. A. Long and the other on Mark Morris's Ted M. Natt Court.
The football team also plays at least one game a year against Mark Morris, also called the Civil War.

State championships
 Boys Swimming: 1939
 Girls Basketball: 1981
 Softball: 1996
 Volleyball: 1983, 1984, 1985, 1990

State runners-up
 Boys Swimming: 1950
 Boys Baseball: 2010
 Softball: 1993, 2013 
 Volleyball: 1982, 1988

Notable alumni 
Jim Caple, sports reporter with ESPN and contributor to Page2, 1980
Loren L. Coleman, science fiction author, 1986
 Steve De Jarnatt, director of cult films Miracle Mile and Cherry 2000
Cole Escola, comedian and actor, 2005
Sharry Konopski, Playboy centerfold, 1986
David Korten, author of When Corporations Rule the World, 1955
Jeff Pilson, current Foreigner bass player, formerly of Dokken and Dio, 1976

References

External links 

R. A. Long High School Alumni Association
 GSHL Football - R.A. Long High School

High schools in Cowlitz County, Washington
Longview, Washington
School buildings on the National Register of Historic Places in Washington (state)
Clock towers in Washington (state)
William B. Ittner buildings
Public high schools in Washington (state)
National Register of Historic Places in Cowlitz County, Washington
Educational institutions established in 1927
1927 establishments in Washington (state)